Time: Live Tour 2013 (stylized as Tohoshinki Live Tour 2013 ～TIME～), also known as the Time Tour, was the sixth Japanese concert tour (tenth overall) by South Korean pop duo Tohoshinki, in support of their sixth Japanese studio album Time (2013). The tour visited all five of Japan's major concert Domes and the Nissan Stadium, the largest seated stadium in Japan.

One of the highest-grossing concert tours of the year, it grossed over US$92.6 million from 18 shows and earned US$17.4 million more from merchandise sales, bringing the total gross to US$110 million. A sell-out, the tour attracted over 890,000 people from 18 shows and an additional 30,000 people from cinema screenings, a dramatic increase from the 550,000 fans who attended their last nationwide tour in 2012.

The Time Tour broke several attendance records in the country; it was the first Dome tour held by non-Japanese Asian performers and the fourth held by international artists in Japan. Among Japanese-singing artists, Tohoshinki were the sixteenth artists to do so. The tour was the highest-attended tour by an international music act in Japan. The duo were also the first international artists to headline a concert at the Nissan Stadium in Yokohama. Tohoshinki have said on their first five-Dome tour, "It's a dream come true."

History
The special site for the tour was official launched on April 18, 2013. Official goods were released on the same day as well.

Records

The tour was officially announced on November 22, 2012 by Tohoshinki's Korean agency, S.M. Entertainment. Commencing the tour with three shows at the Saitama Super Arena in April 2013, the tour then embarked on its five-Dome tour, which include the Sapporo Dome, Nagoya Dome, Fukuoka Yahoo! Dome, Kyocera Osaka Dome, and the Tokyo Dome, consisting of twelve dates over a period of three months. An S.M. representative said, "Any concert hall with a ‘dome’ in it is a place where only the best get to stand. This proves just how big TVXQ is in Japan." On February 21, 2013, four more dates were added to their five-Dome tour, including one extra performance at the Nagoya Dome, two at the Kyocera Dome and one at the Tokyo Dome, increasing the expected to attend to more than 700,000. Tohoshinki are the first non-Japanese Asian artists to hold a complete five-Dome tour in Japan, and the sixteenth Japanese-singing artists to do so. Among other foreign artists who have held five-Dome tours, Tohoshinki came in fourth, following Bon Jovi in 2003, the Eagles in 2004 and Billy Joel in 2006.

On April 27, 2013, during the duo's first show in Saitama, they announced that the tour's final shows would be held at the Nissan Stadium, Japan's largest seated stadium, on August 17 and 18. Tohoshinki are the first international musical act to perform at the venue, setting another record for being the first foreign artists in Japan to bring in an audience of over 850,000. An additional 30,000 people watched the Nissan Stadium concert live in theaters across Japan.

Broadcasts and recordings
A recording of the tour's three concerts at the Tokyo Dome was televised, and it aired on Fuji Television on August 31, 2013. In October 2013, the same recording was released DVD and Blu-ray. Within the first week, the DVD sold over 120,000 copies and the Blu-ray sold over 18,000 copies, debuting at number one on their respective charts. A separate recording of the tour's two final concerts at the Nissan Stadium was also televised, and it aired on Fuji Television in late October 2013. In December 2013, the Nissan recording was released on DVD and Blu-ray. Both peaked at number one on their respective charts, selling nearly 68,000 copies in the first week.

Setlist
This setlist is representative of their first show in Saitama. It does not represent all dates throughout the tour.

"Fated"
"ANDROID"
"Superstar"
"I Don't Know"
"STILL"
"Duet"
"One More Thing"
"Y3K"
"Purple Line" 
"Humanoids" (Japanese version)
"Heart, Mind and Soul"
"I Know"
"One and Only One"
"Rat Tat Tat"
"T-Style" (Yunho solo)
"Rock with U" (Changmin solo)
"O'-Sei.Han.Gō"(O-正・反・合) (Japanese version) (In Nissan Stadium)  / BLINK (In Tokyo Dome) 
"Survivor"
"Share the World"
"Ocean"

"Catch Me -If you wanna-" (Japanese version)
Encore
 "Why? (Keep Your Head Down)" (Japanese version)
 "SCREAM"
 "SHINE"
 
 "Summer Dream"
 "In Our Time"

Notes
During the Nissan Stadium concerts, Tohoshinki performed "OCEAN" in place of "Sky". They also performed "Somebody to Love" after "In Our Time".

Tour dates

Personnel

Main
 Tour organizer: Avex Group, SM Entertainment
 Sponsors:
 Glico
 Seven-Eleven Japan
 7net Shopping
Executive producers – Lee Soo-man (S.M. Entertainment), Max Matsuura (Avex Group)
General producers – Nam So-young (S.M. Entertainment Japan), Ryuhai Chiba (Avex Group)
Tour producer – Yoko Kikuta
Tour director – Masato Yoshikawa
Stage producer – Sam
Executive supervisors – Shinji Hayashi, Akira Akutsu
Artist management – Kang Sung-chang, Kim Jung-min, Her Young-joo, Charlene Ryu
Sound direction – Katsutoshi Yasuhara
Stylist – Yosuko Sasagawa
Hair and make-up – Rei Calin, Hiro
Art designer – Masanori Nagase

Lighting director – Yuichi Kobayashi
Visual director – Osamu Nakamoto
Choreographers – Masao, Pino, Shige, Achi, Kazuki, Taichi
Dancers – Sonny, 50, Ywki, Achi, Tamiya, k-sk, Yoshiki, Ryota, Hiroto, Sappy, Chali, Rui

Band
Tohoshinki (Yunho, Changmin) – Lead vocals
Yoichiro Kakizaki – Band master, keyboards
Tatsuya Hatano – drums
Kazuhiro Sunaga – bass
Kiyoto Konda – guitar
Masao Fukunaga – percussion

References

External links
 Time Concert Official Website 

2013 concert tours
TVXQ concert tours
Albums recorded at the Tokyo Dome